Kobbari Matta is a 2019 Indian Telugu-language parody film film directed by Rupak Ronaldson and written by Steven Shankar. It stars Sampoornesh Babu portraying roles of three generations- Paparayudu, Pedarayudu, and Androyudu.

The film was released theatrically on 10 August 2019.

Cast 
 Sampoornesh Babu in a triple role as Paparayudu, Pedarayudu, and Androidu (And+Rayudu=Androidu)
Ishika Singh as Janaki
Shakeela as Pandu
 Mahesh Kathi as Kamudu
 Gayathri Gupta

Soundtrack

Reception 
Hemanth Kumar of Firstpost rated the film 3/5 and stated: "Kobbari Matta is not only consistently absurd and over the top, but also, it’s an excuse to laugh at ourselves and the cliches prevalent in Telugu cinema." On performances, The Hindu Y. Sunitha Chowdhary opined: "Sampoornesh gets enough dances to show his talent and it is evident he has worked hard to shed his potbelly. Mahesh Katti shines as Kaamudu." A reviewer from Cinema Express also rated the film 3/5 and wrote, "This isn’t a film that takes itself too seriously but is meant to be ridiculous and some more."

References

External links
 

2019 films
2010s Telugu-language films
Indian family films
Indian parody films
Indian action comedy films
2019 action comedy films
2010s parody films